Avakin Life is a 3D life simulation computer and mobile video game developed and published by Lockwood Publishing, a company based in Nottingham, England. The game was first released on December 2013 for Android devices. As per 2022, it has more than 200 million registered users on iOS, Android and ChromeOS and more than a million daily players.

History 

Founded in 2009, Lockwood was a leading developer on Sony's PlayStation Home. Avakin Life, released in 2013, was originally inspired by PlayStation Home as a similar platform for mobile. Avakin Life saw more increment in its player base after Home's closure in 2015.

Gameplay 
Avakin Life is a social simulation video game. It has no primary objective. The player can interact with various components in game and complete various goals. The core features of the game includes:

Avakin 
Player can create their own avatars called Avakin. Avakins are very customizable in terms of body features, accessories, animations and clothing. A player through an Avakin can communicate and interact with other Avakins in game.

Social Spots 
Social spots are open rooms where Avakins can join with other Avakins to communicate in the same language and interact with each other or complete similar goals.

Avacoins 
Social spots include rooms where Avakins can earn Avacoins by doing jobs. Avacoins can also be earned by completing in-game achievements and participating in fashion contests. Avacoins are used to buy in-game shop items like clothing, animations, apartments, furniture and bundles.

Apartments 
Apartments are the personal spaces Avakins can buy. Unlike social spots, apartments can be customized. Players can decorate their apartments and invite other Avakins on their friend-list. Players can make their apartments open so that other Avakins can also visit.

Petkins 
Petkins are virtual pets players can buy, place in their apartments and interact with them. Petkins are non-player characters so, are not operated by players.

See also 
 PlayStation Home
 The Sims Mobile

References

External links 
 

2013 video games
Android (operating system) games
IOS games
Life simulation games
Social simulation video games
Video games developed in the United Kingdom